The Vihorlat-Gutin Area is a region of mountain ranges ranging from eastern Slovakia, through western Ukraine, into northern Romania.

Geologically these ranges are considered part of the Inner Eastern Carpathians. Within Romania, however, it is traditional to divide the Eastern Carpathians in Romanian territory into three geographical groups (north, center, south), instead in "inner"  and "outer" sections. The Romanian portions of Vihorlat-Gutin Area are considered part of the northern Carpathians of Maramureş and Bucovina.

Subdivisions

These mountain ranges include:

 Vihorlat Mountains, encompassing the Vihorlat Protected Landscape Area and the Morské oko (SK and UA); marked a1 on the map
 Makovytsia; marked a2 on the map
 Velikyi Dil; marked a3 on the map
 Tupyi; marked a4 on the map
 Oaș Mountains and Oaș Depression (UK and RO); marked a5 on the map 
 Gutin Mountains (RO); marked a6 on the map
 Ţibleş Mountains  (RO); marked a7 on the map

Panorama

See also
 Ukrainian Carpathians
 Romanian Carpathians

Mountain ranges of the Eastern Carpathians
Mountain ranges of Ukraine
Mountain ranges of Romania